28 Andromedae (abbreviated 28 And) is a Delta Scuti variable star in the constellation Andromeda. 28 Andromedae is the Flamsteed designation. It also bears the variable star name GN Andromedae. Its apparent magnitude is 5.214, varying by less than 0.1 magnitudes.

Description
28 Andromedae is an A-type giant star, meaning it is colored bluish-white. Parallax estimates made by the Hipparcos spacecraft put the star at a distance of about 199 light years (61 parsecs).

Multiplicity of the system 
Two stars near 28 Andromedae share a common proper motion with the primary star, which is then a candidate triple system. The orbital parameters are currently unknown.

Variability cycle
28 Andromedae A is a Delta Scuti variable, so it displays small luminosity variations at timescales less than a day due to star pulsation. There is evidence for two periodic cycles of 5,014 and 5,900 seconds, respectively. The amplitude variations, though, are not constant in time, and the pulsation modes are not radial.

References

External links
 Image 28 Andromedae
 

Andromeda (constellation)
Delta Scuti variables
Andromedae, 28
002628
0114
002355
Durchmusterung objects
A-type giants
Andromedae, GN